Isabella d'Este (3 October 1635 – 21 August 1666) was Duchess of Parma, and second wife of Duke Ranuccio II Farnese. She was the paternal grandmother of Elisabetta Farnese, Queen of Spain.

Princess of Modena

Isabella was a daughter of the Duke of Modena Francesco I d'Este and Maria Caterina Farnese, daughter of Ranuccio I Farnese, Duke of Parma. She was the sister of two Dukes of Modena, Alfonso IV d'Este (1634–1662) and Rinaldo (1655–1737). At the death of her mother, her father married again twice.

Duchess of Parma

After the death of his first wife Marguerite Yolande of Savoy, Ranuccio II married in 1663 his cousin Isabella. But the couple only met on 18 February 1664, when Isabella arrived in Parma. For this occasion, a grandiose celebration and musical spectacles were organised. The couple had three children, all of whom would survive childhood. Only the youngest Odoardo, would have issue; he was the father of Elisabeth Farnese, queen of Spain and ancestor of most modern royalty.

But the birth of her son proved fatal to Isabella, who died of complications nine days later on 21 August, at Colorno. She was buried at the Sanctuary of Santa Maria della Steccata in the city of Parma on the 23 August. Her husband remarried in October 1668 to her sister Maria d'Este. By her he had a further seven children as well as the last two Farnese Dukes of Parma.

Issue

Margherita Maria Farnese (24 November 1664 – 17 June 1718), married 1692 Francesco II d'Este, Duke of Modena.
Teresa Farnese (1665–1702), benedictine nun in Sant’ Alessandro Monastery of Parma.
Odoardo Farnese, Hereditary Prince of Parma (12 August 1666 – 1693), heir to the Duchy of Parma and Piacenza, but who died before his father. He married Countess Palatine Dorothea Sophie of Neuburg, and was the father of Isabelle Farnese, future Queen of Spain.

Ancestry

1635 births
1666 deaths
Isabella
Isabella d' Este
Isabella d' Este
Isabella
17th-century Italian nobility
17th-century Italian women
Deaths in childbirth
Burials at the Sanctuary of Santa Maria della Steccata
Daughters of monarchs